Monique Niseema Theillaud (born on March 19, 1952) is a French actor director.

Life 
She studied with  Jean Périmony and Maximilien Decroux.

She is a director, and a teacher. She teaches drama at the Orléans conservatory.

Niseema Theillaud is the director for the Cotillard company.

Family 
Niseema Theillaud is married to Jean-Claude Cotillard, actor, mime, director and teacher. They have three children: Marion Cotillard (born in 1975), actress; Guillaume Cotillard (born in 1977), screenwriter, actor and director; and Quentin Cotillard (born in 1977), painter, sculptor and co-director of a digital agency, based in San Francisco.

Filmography 

 1999 : Du bleu jusqu'en Amérique of Sarah Lévy : mother of Solange
 2010 : Les Petits Mouchoirs of  Guillaume Canet : Sabine
 2011 : Pourquoi tu pleures ? of Katia Lewkowicz : Josy
 2011 : Switch, of Frédéric Schoendoerffer : Alice Serteaux
 2014 : 96 heures of Frédéric Schoendoerffer : prefect
 2014 : The Smell of Us of Larry Clark : Catherine
 2015 : Familles je vous aime of Gabriel Julien-Laferrière
 2016 : Sous le même toit of Dominique Farrugia : Joséphine
 2016 : Merrick of Benjamin Diouris : Mila
 2017 : Je ne suis pas un homme facile of Éléonore Pourriat : Brigitte Magre
 2018 : Love Addict of Frank Bellocq : Mme Roland
 2019 : Quand on crie au loup of Marilou Berry : Mme Van de Broeck
 2020 : L'Aventure des Marguerite of Pierre Coré : Grand-mère
 2020 : The Only One of Noah Gilbert : Madame Gerard

References 

1952 births
Living people
French actors
French directors